The Hubballi–Chennai Central Superfast Express is a Superfast train belonging to South Western Railway zone that runs between  and  in India. It is currently being operated with 22697/22698 train numbers on a weekly basis.

Service

The 22697/Hubballi–Chennai Central Superfast Express has an average speed of 54 km/hr and covers 831 km in 15h 30m. The 22698/Chennai Central–Hubballi Superfast Express has an average speed of 54 km/hr and covers 831 km in 15h 20m.

Route and halts 

The important halts of the train are:

Coach composition

The train has standard ICF rakes with max speed of 110 kmph. The train consists of 16 coaches:

 1 AC II Tier
 2 AC III Tier
 7 Sleeper coaches
 4 General Unreserved
 2 Seating cum Luggage Rake

Traction

Both trains are hauled by a Krishnarajapuram Loco Shed-based WDP-4D diesel locomotive from Chennai to Yesvantpur. From Yesvantpur train is hauled by an Arakkonam Loco Shed-based WAP-4 electric locomotive to Hubli, and vice versa.

Direction reversal

The train reverses its direction 1 times:

See also 

 Chennai Central railway station
 Hubli Junction railway station

Notes

References

External links 

 22697/Hubballi - Chennai Central Superfast Express India Rail Info
 22698/Chennai Central - Hubballi Superfast Express India Rail Info

Transport in Chennai
Transport in Hubli-Dharwad
Express trains in India
Rail transport in Karnataka
Rail transport in Tamil Nadu
Railway services introduced in 2003